John Harvey, simply known as Harvey (born June 13, 1951), is an American television and radio personality, often credited by his last name. He was the announcer for Double Dare, Finders Keepers, and History IQ. In addition to his announcer work, he hosted and built projects on Gimme Shelter, a home improvement program on The Discovery Channel in the late 1990s.

On Double Dare, he was referred to as "Harvey the Announcer" or "Harvey". Prior to his announcing duties at Nickelodeon, Harvey had worked at Philadelphia radio station WIOQ from 1977 to 1989, hosting "Harvey in the Morning" (which also served as his radio stage name at the time). The show then moved to WMGK and lasted until the mid 1990s.

In the early 2000s, Harvey was first a location scout and later a producer for the TLC TV series Trading Spaces. Earlier in the late 90s, he hosted the home improvement show Gimme Shelter for the Discovery Channel.

Harvey is now running his own business, claiming to "have left show business behind" after 35 years in the industry, and is now a handyman, doing home restoration. However, he still reprises his role as "Harvey the Announcer" at occasional Double Dare reunions.

References

External links

American radio personalities
American television producers
Game show announcers
1951 births
Living people
Place of birth missing (living people)